The Lockheed Martin AN/AAS-38 Nite Hawk is a FLIR, laser designator, and laser tracker pod system for use with laser-guided munitions.

The Nite Hawk has been used with the F/A-18 Hornet, and has presumably been tested with the A-7E Corsair II.  The Lockheed Martin (ex Loral / Texas Instruments ex Ford Aerospace / Texas Instruments) AAS-38A/B Nite Hawk forward-looking infrared (FLIR) is the Night Attack Hornet [F/A-18C and F/A-18D] Laser Target Designation (LTD) system for laser-guided munitions delivery. Mounted on the port fuselage (Station 4), the AAS-38 enhances the Hornet's night attack capability by providing real-time Forward Looking Infrared [FLIR] thermal imagery displayed on one of the cockpit CRTs and HUD. The AAS-38 FLIR can be fully integrated with other Hornet avionics, and data from the unit is used for the calculation of weapons release solutions. Only four of these were available during the Gulf War, seeing service with VMFA (AW)-121. The improved AAS-38A Laser Target Designator/Rangefinder (LTD/R) was cleared for Fleet service on Hornet-C/Ds in January 1993. The Martin-Marietta ASQ-173 Laser Detector Tracker/CAMera (LDT/CAM), a derivative of the Air Force Pave Penny pod, does not have the ability to laser designate targets. It is a passive tracking device that detects laser light reflected from targets illuminated by ground troops, other aircraft or the Hornet's own AAS-38 targeting FLIR on the other side of the fuselage. The ASQ-173 relays target location information to the cockpit displays and mission computers.

The AAS-38 pod came in two varieties: The AAS-38 (non LASER Designator/TV FLIR only) AAS-38A LASER Target Designator/Ranger (LTD/R). The LASER Spot Tracker (LST) capability came from the use of the ASQ-173 pod. The AAS-38A and ASQ-173 pods are meant to be used together to be able to Designate for Laser Guided Weapons (Example: GBU-12) and "see" another source's LASER designator (LST capability of the ASQ-173 pod. The AN/AAS-38A is commonly referred to by the US Navy as TFLIR or Targeting FLIR. The AAS-38 pod system, as of May 2008, is being phased out and replaced by the ASQ-228 ATFLIR pod. This will be a sequential replacement as the ATFLIR pods become available.  The introduction of the ATFLIR is seen as a significant capability increase in all Hornet US Navy fleet aircraft.

References

External links
 Federation of American Scientists' page

Military electronics of the United States
Military equipment introduced in the 1990s
Night flying
Targeting pods